

Toshiko Akiyoshi – Lew Tabackin Big Band albums
Kogun (1974)
Long Yellow Road (1975)
Tales of a Courtesan (Oirantan) (1975) – also known as HANA KAI TAN
Road Time (1976)
Insights (1976)
March of the Tadpoles (1977)
Live at Newport '77 (1977)
Live at Newport II (1977)
Salted Gingko Nuts (1978) – also known as SHIO GIN NAN
Sumi-e (1979)
Farewell (1980) – also released as Farewell To Mingus
From Toshiko with Love (1981) – also released as Tanuki's Night Out
European Memoirs (1982)

Toshiko Akiyoshi Jazz Orchestra albums
Ten Gallon Shuffle (1984)
Wishing Peace (1986)
Carnegie Hall Concert (1991)
Desert Lady / Fantasy (1993)
Four Seasons of Morita Village (1996)
Monopoly Game (1998)
Tribute to Duke Ellington (1999)
Hiroshima - Rising from the Abyss (2001)
Last Live in Blue Note Tokyo (2003)
Toshiko Akiyoshi Jazz Orchestra in Shanghai (2011)

Video recordings
My Elegy (c. 1984), LaserDisc Corp.
Strive for Jive (c. 1993), VIEW Video
In Shanghai (2011), Pony Canyon

Appearances in other videos:
Monterey Jazz festival 1975 (2007), Storyville Films
Jazz Shots From The West Coast, Vol. 1 (2005), Efor Films
Jazz Is My Native Language (c. 1982) – documentary

Compilation albums
Mosaic Select: Toshiko Akiyoshi - Lew Tabackin Big Band (2008), Mosaic Records
NOVUS Series '70: The Toshiko Akiyoshi - Lew Tabackin Big Band (1991), BMG / Novus
Eternal Best (Toshiko Akiyoshi) (1998), BMG / Victor (Japan) – also known as Best 8
The Best of Toshiko Akiyoshi (2002), BMG / Victor
Inclusion in other compilations:
Shibuya Jazz Classics: Toshiko Akiyoshi Issue (2006), Solid Records
The World of Toshiko Akiyoshi, u-can club / Nippon Crown / BMG Japan – 12 CD compilation
Big Band Renaissance (1996), Smithsonian Collection
RCA Victor 80th Anniversary, Vol. 6 (1970–1979) (1997), RCA
Others...

Honors and awards
See Toshiko Akiyoshi – Lew Tabackin Big Band#Honors and awards

References / External links

Allmusic [ Toshiko Akiyoshi discography].  Accessed 3 June 2007.
BMG Japan, Toshiko Akiyoshi discography.  Accessed 3 June 2007.
Videoarts Music, Toshiko Akiyoshi.  Accessed 3 June 2007.
Warner Music Japan, Toshiko Akiyoshi.  Accessed 3 June 2007.
Musicmatch Guide Toshiko Akiyoshi discography.  Accessed 3 June 2007.
LA Times, LA Times Awards database, Past Grammy winners/nominees database.  Accessed 3 June 2007.
Down Beat magazine Critic's Poll winners database "archives".  Accessed 3 June 2007.
JAZZ CD.jp Swing Journal magazine annual disk awards (Japanese link).  Accessed 3 June 2007.

Jazz discographies
Discographies of American artists